The 2012 Liebherr World Team Table Tennis Championships were held at the Westfalenhallen in Dortmund, Germany from March 25 to April 1, 2012. It was the 51st edition to be contested. 120 men's teams and 92 women's teams were allocated to different divisions according to the final ranking of the previous World Team Table Tennis Championships and the ITTF World Team Rankings. The winner of the first division, called the Championship Division, was crowned as the new champion.

To be eligible to have a team entered for the team events in 2012 Summer Olympics, the ITTF member association must have participated in the tournament. The ranking of the 2012 Championships was taken into account for the Olympic qualification after the final world Olympic qualification tournament, which was held from May 10 to May 13.

Seeding
The Championship Division comprised 24 teams. The top 18 teams of the Championship Division at the 2010 World Team Championships were guaranteed a spot in the championship division. The top two teams of the Second Division in 2010 automatically advanced to the Championship Division in 2012. The other four spots were announced according to the ITTF World Team Rankings published in February, 2012.

Medal summary

Events

Medal table

Results

Men's team

Women's team

References

External links

ITTF.com

 
World Table Tennis Championships
World Team Table Tennis Championships
World Team Table Tennis Championships
World Team Table Tennis Championships
Table tennis competitions in Germany
Sports competitions in Dortmund
2010s in North Rhine-Westphalia
21st century in Dortmund
March 2012 sports events in Europe
April 2012 sports events in Europe